Sichan Bolaghi (also Romanized as Sīchān Bolāghī; also known as Sechān Bolāghī and Sīchān Bolāgh) is a village in Akhtachi-ye Gharbi Rural District, in the Central District of Mahabad County, West Azerbaijan Province, Iran. At the 2006 census, its population was 53, in 10 families.

References 

Populated places in Mahabad County